The 2012 Wuxi Classic was a professional ranking snooker tournament held between 25 June–1 July 2012 at the Wuxi City Sports Park Stadium in Wuxi, China. It was the first year of the tournament as a ranking event, having been non-ranking in its previous playings. It was also the first ranking event of the 2012/2013 season.

Mark Selby was the defending champion, but he lost in the quarter-finals 5–4 against Stuart Bingham.

Ricky Walden won his second ranking title by defeating Bingham 10–4 in the final. During the final Bingham made the 89th official maximum break. This was Bingham's third 147 break.


Prize fund
It was announced on 2 May 2012, that this year's prize money would be £400,000, which would rise to £425,000 for next year and then to £450,000 for the following three years. The breakdown of prize money for this year is shown below:

Winner: £75,000
Runner-up: £30,000
Semi-final: £18,000
Quarter-final: £10,000
Last 16: £7,500
Last 32: £6,000
Last 48: £2,300
Last 64: £1,500

Non-televised highest break: £200
Televised highest break: £2,000
Televised maximum break: £5,000
Total: £405,000

Wildcard round
These matches were played in Wuxi on 25 and 26 June 2012.

Main draw

Final

Qualifying
These matches were held between 5 and 8 June 2012 at the World Snooker Academy in Sheffield, England. In the fourth frame of the match between Dominic Dale and Peter Lines a 20-year-old record from the 1992 Asian Open was broken. They accumulated 192 points, the most in a single frame in the history of snooker. Lines won the frame 108–84. The previous record was 185, made when Sean Storey defeated Graham Cripsey 93–92.

Century breaks

Qualifying stage centuries

 136  Thepchaiya Un-Nooh
 136  Mark Joyce
 136  Dechawat Poomjaeng
 131  David Grace
 131  Passakorn Suwannawat
 130, 110  Joe Perry
 128, 102  Anthony Hamilton
 127  Ian Burns
 123, 105  Kurt Maflin
 123  Simon Bedford
 122, 108, 105  Luca Brecel
 118  Chen Zhe

 118  Fergal O'Brien
 112, 111  Liam Highfield
 112, 106, 100  Jimmy Robertson
 110, 105  Mark King
 110  Dave Harold
 107  Michael Holt
 107  Paul Davison
 104  Zhang Anda
 104  Liu Chuang
 103  Marco Fu
 100  Yu Delu
 100  Michael White

Televised stage centuries

 147, 143, 134, 124, 110, 103, 100  Stuart Bingham
 137, 113, 108  Judd Trump
 129  Rod Lawler
 120, 101  Mark Selby
 115  Zhou Yuelong
 104, 102  Ricky Walden
 102  Ken Doherty
 101  Lu Ning

References

External links 

2012
Wuxi Classic
Wuxi Classic